Architype Renner is a geometric sans-serif typeface reproducing the experimental alternate characters of Paul Renner's 1927–29 typeface Futura for the Bauer foundry. Renner's original design for Futura shows the influence of Herbert Bayer's experimental "Universal" alphabet. The alternate characters Renner proposed for Futura were mostly deleted from the face's character set, resulting in a more conventional, and perhaps more economically successful typeface. 

Alternate characters were drawn for lowercase a, g, and r, and for some punctuation, and uppercase characters including German accents. Both lining and text figures were produced. The Renner Architype typeface is one of a collection of several revivals of early twentieth century typographic experimentation designed by Freda Sack and David Quay of The Foundry.

See also
Architype Albers
Architype Aubette
Architype Bayer
Architype Schwitters
Architype van der Leck
Architype Van Doesburg

References
Blackwell, Lewis. 20th Century Type. Yale University Press: 2004. .
Burke, Christopher. Paul Renner: The Art of Typography. Hypen Press: 1998. .
Jaspert, W. Pincus, W. Turner Berry and A. F.  Johnson. Encyclopædia of Typefaces. Blandford Press; 1983. .
Meggs, Philip. B and McKelvey, Roy. Revival of the Fittest: Digital Versions of Classic Typefaces. RC Publications; 2002. 
Haley, Allen. Type: Hot Designers Make Cool Fonts. Rockport Publishers Inc, Gloucester; 1998.

External links
Architype 1 types
Website for The Foundry
Website of Emotional Digital describing work by The Foundry

Geometric sans-serif typefaces
Typefaces with text figures
Typefaces designed by Paul Renner